Moloka‘i Coffee refers to a legally protected, geographical indication of coffee grown on the island of Moloka'i in Maui County, Hawaii, and processed to specific, legally defined standards. Similar to Kona coffee, Molokai coffee is a market name for a product of specific origin and of a defined quality. Requirements for Molokai coffee not only dictate the origin and quality, but also label design and placement on product package. 

Hawaii is one of the few U.S. states where coffee production is a significant economic industry—coffee is the second largest crop produced there. The 2019-2020 coffee harvest in Hawaii was valued at $102.91million.

Legal definition
To be legally labeled "Molokai Coffee," the coffee must be grown in the geographical region of Molokai and meet the minimum requirements to be classified as "Molokai Prime" green coffee. The requirements to be labeled "Molokai Prime" green include specific quality requirements. For example:

History 

In 1984 the company Coffees of Hawaii, Inc. was formed and land-lease contracts were formed with Molokai Ranch to establish a coffee farm in the Molokai region. 

Four years later, 600 acres were planted with coffee and by 1993 the first commercial harvest was produced.

Producers 

German merchant Rudolph Wilhelm Meyer (1826–1897) grew coffee on the island and also built a sugar mill.
"Coffees of Hawaii" is currently the only producer of Moloka‘i coffee. They are located on a  plantation in Kualapu'u.

Distributors 
Trader Joe's introduced this coffee in mid-2008. The packaging, a  can, featured two red hummingbirds on a light yellow background filled with flowers The can was titled "Moloka'i 100% One Hundred Percent Hawaiian Coffee" and labeled the coffee "Dark Roast, Robust & Earthy, 100% Arabica Whole Bean Coffee".

See also
 Coffee production in Hawaii
 Kona coffee

References 

Types of coffee
Molokai